4282 Endate, provisional designation , is an asteroid from the inner regions of the asteroid belt, approximately 10 kilometers in diameter. It was discovered on 28 October 1987, by Japanese astronomers Seiji Ueda and Hiroshi Kaneda at Kushiro Observatory in Japan. It was named for amateur astronomer Kin Endate.

Orbit and classification 

Endate is a presumed stony S-type asteroid. It orbits the Sun in the inner main-belt at a distance of 2.0–2.7 AU once every 3 years and 8 months (1,351 days). Its orbit has an eccentricity of 0.15 and an inclination of 3° with respect to the ecliptic. The first precovery was taken at Palomar Observatory in 1954, extending the body's observation arc by 33 years prior to its official discovery observation.

Physical characteristics

Rotation period 

In April 2014, a rotational lightcurve of Endate was obtained from photometric observations by Hungarian astronomer Gyula M. Szabó. Lightcurve analysis gave it a longer-than average rotation period of 34 hours with a brightness amplitude of 0.5 magnitude. Most minor planets have a spin rate between 2 and 20 hours. Endates rotation period is significantly longer but still much shorter than that of the so-called slow rotators, which take at least 100 hours to rotate once around their axis.

Diameter and albedo 

According to the surveys carried out by the Japanese Akari satellite and NASA's Wide-field Infrared Survey Explorer with its subsequent NEOWISE mission, Endate measures between 7.386 and 13.73 kilometers in diameter and its surface has an albedo between 0.038 and 0.15. The Collaborative Asteroid Lightcurve Link assumes a standard albedo for stony asteroids of 0.20 and consequently calculates a smaller diameter of 5.66 kilometers.

Naming 

This minor planet was named in honor of Japanese amateur astronomer Kin Endate from Bihoro in northern Japan. He is a prolific observer and discoverer of minor planets. The official naming citation was published by the Minor Planet Center on 8 July 1990.

References

External links 
 Gyula M. Szabó, astronomer
 Asteroid Lightcurve Database (LCDB), query form (info )
 Dictionary of Minor Planet Names, Google books
 Asteroids and comets rotation curves, CdR – Observatoire de Genève, Raoul Behrend
 Discovery Circumstances: Numbered Minor Planets (1)-(5000) – Minor Planet Center
 

004282
Discoveries by Seiji Ueda
Discoveries by Hiroshi Kaneda
Named minor planets
19871028